John Benjamin Goodwin (September 22, 1850 – May 12, 1921) was born in Cobb County, Georgia, United States the son of and attended school in Powder Springs.
He moved to Atlanta in 1870 and studied law at Gartrell & Stephens and a year later was admitted to the bar.
From 1872 to 1874, he was a reporter for Alexander St. Clair-Abrams at the Daily Herald after which he returned to law.

He served on the city council off and on from then until 1883 when he was elected mayor, after which he served over ten years as city attorney, then served as mayor a second time during the Panic of 1893. He left the city in 1901 and for 16 years served as the grand secretary of the Sovereign Grand Lodge, Independent Order of Odd Fellows.

He died in 1921 in Baltimore, Maryland.

References
 Garrett, Franklin, Atlanta and Its Environs, 1954, University of Georgia Press.
 Reed, Wallace, History of Atlanta, Georgia, 1889, D. Mason & co., Atlanta On Google Books

Notes

1850 births
1921 deaths
People from Powder Springs, Georgia
Mayors of Atlanta
Georgia (U.S. state) city council members
American newspaper reporters and correspondents